Sakornia, is a mountain in Georgia. Part of the Meskheti Range, it is located within the Chokhatauri Municipality of Guria and has an elevation of 2752 metres.

References

Mountains of Georgia (country)
Geography of Guria